The Resuscitation Outcomes Consortium (ROC) is a network of eleven regional clinical centers and a data coordinating center. The consortium conducts experimental and observational studies of out-of-hospital treatments of cardiac arrest and trauma. 
Ten communities in the United States and Canada doing uniform quality improvement, clinical trials, and tracking of cardiac arrest and major trauma. The network is coordinated by the University of Washington Clinical Trial Center.  ROC is funded by the National Heart, Lung, and Blood Institute, Institute of Circulatory and Respiratory Health, United States Army Medical Research and Materiel Command, Defence Research and Development Canada, Heart and Stroke Foundation of Canada, and American Heart Association.

Research Sites

Studies

Epistry Database

Hypertonic Saline

ROC PRIMED

(Prehospital Resuscitation using an IMpedance valve and Early vs Delayed analysis) Seattle/King County did not participate in the early vs. delayed analysis portion of the trial.

CPR Feedback

Footnotes

References 
 
 
 
 ROC Update - Dr. Kudenchuck

External links 
 Resuscitation Outcomes Consortium
 The Alabama Resuscitation Center
 The Dallas Center for Resuscitation Research
 The Milwaukee Resuscitation Research Center
 Resuscitation Outcomes Consortium - Emergency Medicine Research - Ottawa Hospital Research Institute
 The British Columbia Resuscitation Outcomes Consortium Network
 Center for Research on Emergency Medical Services - Resuscitation Outcomes Consortium
 OHSU ROC Study
 Rescu (Toronto RescuNET)
 ROC (Resuscitation Outcomes Consortium) Studies | UW Medicine, Seattle

Emergency medical services
Emergency services in Washington (state)